The Museum of Historical Costume in Poland (Polish: Muzeum Historii Ubioru w Poznaniu [m'ooz'e'oom h'eest'or'ee'ee 'oob'ee'or'oo]) is a private museum located in a tenement house on Kwiatowa Street 14/2 in Poznan, Poland. Founded in December, 2018 by Anna Moryto.

History 
The museum was founded by Anna Moryto, private Polish collector of historical vintage dresses and costumes. It has transformed into a museum in December 2018 from a private art gallery – XIXgallery. The gallery was known from its traveling exhibitions around the country. Since 2004, Anna Moryto is collecting historical vintage dresses and accessories, mostly from the 19th century. The original nineteenth-century pieces come from trade and auction houses from the US and London.

Next to the museum there is working an atelier of the reconstruction of costumes “Costumes With Passion” (“Stroje z Pasją”). The atelier is conducting the renovation and maintenance of the exhibits, and creating reconstructions of the dresses from 19th century.

Mission 
The mission of the museum is an educational nature. The plans for the future contain transforming into historical theme museum. It would cover the 19th century lifestyle and culture, and position of the women in the society. The fashion itself would become more as a part of the bigger picture. The mission of the museum is to educate children, young adults, and history enthusiasts about 19th history and history of fashion. It is a unique opportunity to see the vintage costumes live. The museum is also substantive support for costume designers. There are plans for upcoming temporary collections and one permanent exhibition.

Collection 
The collection consists over 80 antique exhibits, including over 50 complete costumes, mostly from 19th century. It is the largest complication of the original historical costumes in Poland. Only few of the dresses among the collection were made as reconstructions. The collection includes dresses, underwear and accessories.

The most highlight exhibits are:

 Summer dress from the 1840s century
 Dress from 1840 with decoration made of fake buttons
 Evening gown ca. 1880, from trading house B. Altman.

Traveling Exhibitions 

 September 27, 2018 – December 9, 2018 – District Museum in Pila, Poland
 September 12, 2018 – December 14, 2018 – Museum of Fortifications and Weapons “Arsenal” in Zamosc, Poland
 December 17, 2017 – January 15, 2018 – City Museum in Nowa Sol, Poland
 July 6, 2017 – September 8, 2017 – Regional Museum in Czluchow, Poland
 March 8, 2017 – May 14, 2017 – Museum Gorki's Castle in Szamotuly, Poland
 March 5, 2016 – May 4, 2016 – Museum of Silesian Piasts in Brzeg, Poland
 July 2, 2015 – September 6, 2015 – Regional Museum in Szczecinek, Poland
 March 8, 2014 – May 27, 2014 – Silesian Museum of Opole Region in Opole, Poland
 May 2012 – June 3, 2012 – Museum of Henryk Sienkiewicz in Oblegork, Poland.

Gallery

See also 

 Poznan
 History of Fashion Design
 19th century in fashion
 Museums in Poland

References

External links 

 The Museum of Historical Cotume in Poznan, Poland
 Museums in Poland
 Poznan city

Historical Costume
Feminism and education
Costume design
Costume museums
Polish fashion
Fashion museums